The 1996 African Cup Winners' Cup football club tournament was won by El Mokawloon El Arab in two-legged final victory against AC Sodigraf. This was the twenty-third season that the tournament took place for the winners of each African country's domestic cup. Thirty-seven sides entered the competition. Teams from Mauritania were disqualified because their federation was in debt to CAF. Great Olympics, Posta and Zasmure all withdrew before the 1st leg of the first round while Chapungu withdrew after the 1st leg. Olympique Béja withdrew before 1st leg of the second round and finally, Pretoria City withdrew before the 1st leg of the quarterfinals.

Preliminary round

|}

Notes
1 teams from Mauritania were disqualified because their federation was in debt to CAF.

First round

|}

Notes
1 2nd leg originally abandoned at 1-0 to Étoile du Congo.

Second round

|}

Quarter-finals

|}

Semi-finals

|}

Final

|}

First leg

Second leg

Champions

See also
 1996 African Cup of Champions Clubs
 1997 CAF Super Cup

External links
 Results available on CAF Official Website
 Results available on RSSSF

African Cup Winners' Cup
2